Blues Pills is the debut studio album by Swedish rock band Blues Pills, released on July 25, 2014 by Nuclear Blast Records. The album consists of ten tracks including some re-recorded releases from previous EPs and a cover of the Chubby Checker song Gypsy. Two singles were released, High Class Woman and No Hope Left For Me, and both songs had music videos by Nuclear Blast.

Reception

Many reviews praise the improvement on the re-recording of the tracks that had previously appeared on EPs. Reviews mention the sound and style comparing to 60s blues and 70s rock influences. The album received predominantly positive online professional reviews.

Track listing
All songs written and composed by Elin Larsson, Dorian Sorriaux, and Zach Anderson (except where noted)

Personnel
Blues Pills
Elin Larsson – vocals
Dorian Sorriaux - electric and acoustic guitars
Zach Anderson - bass guitar
Cory Berry - drums, percussion

Additional personnel
Don Alsterberg - production, mixing, recording
Joel Westberg - Additional percussion
Hans Olsson-Brookes - mastering
 - cover design
Kiryk Drewinski - layout, illustration

References

External links
 BLUES PILLS - Nuclear Blast
 Blues Pills

2014 debut albums